Beirut–Rafic Hariri International Airport (Arabic: مطار رفيق الحريري الدولي بيروت, (previously known as  Beirut International Airport) is the only operational commercial airport in Lebanon, which is located in the Southern Suburbs of Beirut, Lebanon,  from the city center. It is the hub for Lebanon's national carrier, Middle East Airlines (MEA) and was the hub for the Lebanese cargo carrier TMA cargo and Wings of Lebanon before their respective collapses.

The airport is named after former Lebanese Prime Minister Rafic Hariri in 2005, who was assassinated earlier that year.

It is the main port of entry into the country along with the Port of Beirut. The airport is managed and operated by the Directorate General of Civil Aviation (DGCA), which operates within the Ministry of Public Works and Transport. The DGCA is also responsible for operating the air traffic control (ATC) at the airport as well as controlling Lebanon's airspace. DGCA duties include maintenance and general upkeep ranging from cleaning the terminal to de-rubberising the runways.

History
The airport opened on 23 April 1954, replacing the much smaller Bir Hassan Airfield which was located a short distance north. At the time of its opening, the terminal was very modern and it featured an excellent spotters terrace with a café. The airport consisted of two asphalt runways at the time.

Premier Middle East hub
The airport grew to become a premier hub in the Middle East, thanks to limited competition from neighbours, with fast and steady growth by the country's four carriers at the time, Middle East Airlines (MEA), Air Liban, Trans Mediterranean Airways (TMA), and Lebanese International Airways (LIA), and numerous other foreign carriers.

Israeli assault

In response to an attack on El Al Flight 253 two days earlier in Athens, on the night of 28 December 1968, Israeli commandos mounted a surprise attack on the airport and destroyed 14 civilian aircraft operated by the Lebanese carriers, Middle East Airlines (Air Liban had merged with MEA by this time), Trans Mediterranean Airways, and Lebanese International Airways. This caused serious devastation to the Lebanese aviation industry. Middle East Airlines managed to rebound quickly, but Lebanese International Airways went bankrupt and its employees were transferred to MEA.

Lebanese Civil War

The airport lost its status as one of the premier hubs of the Middle East with the start of the 15-year-long Lebanese Civil War in April 1975 and lost virtually all of its airline services with the exception of two Lebanese carriers, Middle East Airlines and Trans Mediterranean Airways. Both airlines continued operating with the exception of certain periods of time when the airport itself was completely closed. Despite the conflict, the terminal was renovated in 1977, only to be badly damaged five years later by Israeli shelling during the 1982 Israeli invasion of Lebanon. The airport was the site of the 1983 Beirut barracks bombing, in which 241 American servicemen were killed. The airport's runways were renovated in 1982 and 1984.

Reconstruction

By the time war finally came to an end in 1990, the airport needed to launch a massive reconstruction program. A ten-year reconstruction program was launched in 1994 which included the construction of another terminal, two runways, a fire station, a power plant, a general aviation terminal, and an underground parking garage. Many structures, like the radar building, were rehabilitated.

In 1998 the first phase of the new terminal was completed. It was located immediately adjacent to the east of the old terminal and consists of gates 1–12. After it was inaugurated, the old terminal was demolished and construction on the western half began and was completed in 2000, however it was not inaugurated until 2002. This consists of gates 13–23. The new terminal can handle 6 million passengers annually and is expected to be expanded to handle 16 million passengers by 2035.

It was decided early on that the original runways were no longer sufficient. This seaward protrusion was built in order to move landing traffic away from the city in a bid to improve safety and reduce aircraft noise. A new take-off runway was constructed parallel to the old 03/21 at a length of  making it the longest runway in the airport. The old 03/21 was converted to a taxiway for accessing the new runway 03/21. Unlike the old runways, the two new runways were constructed from concrete and feature more advanced lighting systems and instrument landing systems. In 2004, runway 17/35 was re-designated 16/34 and runway 18/36 was re-designated 17/35 after more accurate runway heading measurements were conducted. Despite being essentially replaced by and adjacent to the new runway 16/34, runway 17/35 is still open, although it is rarely used.

On 17 June 2005, the General Aviation Terminal was finally opened. It is located on the northwestern corner of the airport. All fixed-base operators and VIP charter providers have moved their operations to this state-of-the-art terminal.

More damage during the 2006 war

On 13 July 2006 at approximately 6:00 a.m. local time, all three runways of the airport sustained significant damage from missile strikes directed at it by the Israeli Air Force as part of the 2006 Lebanon War. The Israeli Air Force claimed that the airport was a military target because Hezbollah was receiving weapons shipments there. The runways were rendered inoperative and the Lebanese Government declared that the airport was closed until further notice.

Shortly thereafter, MEA used one of the long taxiways at the airport to evacuate five of its aircraft (four Airbus A321s and one Airbus A330).

Limited activity at the airport
The airport reopened to commercial flights on 17 August 2006, with the arrival of a Middle East Airlines (MEA) flight around 1:10 p.m. local time from Amman, followed by a Royal Jordanian flight also from Amman. This marked the first commercial flight arrival at Beirut International Airport since the airport's closure almost five weeks before. All runways and taxiways at the airport have been successfully repaired and the airport is operating as it was before the hostilities.

Israel ends air blockade
On 7 September 2006, Israel ended its air blockade of Lebanon. The first plane to land at the airport after the end of the blockade was a Middle East Airlines flight at 6:06 p.m. local time. Soon after that, a Kuwait Airways flight landed at the airport. Over the next couple of days, more airlines resumed flights to the airport.

U.S. air traffic ban amended
On 6 June 2007, U.S. President George W. Bush amended a ban on air traffic to Lebanon imposed since the 1985 hijacking of TWA Flight 847 to allow flights by the U.S. Government. A press release issued by the White House said that the "prohibition of transportation services to Lebanon...is hereby further amended to permit U.S. air carriers under contract to the United States Government to engage in foreign air transportation to and from Lebanon of passengers, including U.S. and non-U.S. citizens, and their accompanying baggage; of goods for humanitarian purposes; and of any other cargo or materiel."

First Airbus A380 flight
On 29 March 2018, Emirates operated a one-off Airbus A380 service to Beirut. It was a trial flight in order to test the airport's handling of the aircraft. The aircraft parked at gate 1, which is capable of handling the Airbus A380. This marked the first time the A380 had landed in Lebanon.

2019 renovation and minor expansion
On 1 June 2019, the airport launched the new renovated and expanded departures and arrivals terminals. New customs counters were installed for both the departures and arrivals terminals. The airport is going to improve security by using newer equipment, relocate most of the security checkpoints, install an improved baggage handling system and inaugurate a fast track system for business and first class passengers by the end of the summer.

Impact of 2020 Port of Beirut explosion
On 4 August 2020, a massive explosion in Beirut resulted in the airport sustaining moderate damage to the terminal buildings. Doors and windows were destroyed, and ceiling tiles were shaken loose by the shockwave, severing electrical wires. Despite the damage, flights to the airport resumed following the explosion.

Passenger terminal
The terminal consists of two wings: the East and West Wing, which are connected together by the main terminal, forming a U‑shaped building, with each wing being parallel to the other, and the main terminal connecting the wings. The modern terminal consists of 23 gates, 19 of which have jetways, two of which are dual jetway gates for large aircraft, and two are bus gates which have been decommissioned. Smoking is prohibited in almost all areas inside the terminal, with a few exceptions (see East and West Wing section below).

Main Terminal
The main terminal includes the bulk of the duty-free, some other shops, restaurants, and the lounges. The main terminal has four levels:

 The ground level, which contains the arrival area, and also contains a duty-free section for arriving passengers next to baggage claim. The duty-free shops and baggage area are accessible to arriving passengers after they clear passport control, but before they clear customs (this duty-free, like all the others, is not open to the general public). The general public has access to the waiting area, and there are various cafes and restaurants open to the public.
 The second level contains the departure area, ticketing, security checkpoint, customs, and immigration. It also includes the primary duty-free shopping area, which is only accessible to ticketed passengers once they clear immigration.
 The third level houses all of the private airline lounges, prayer rooms, as well as a restaurant with a nice view on the tarmac.
 The fourth level, which is closed to the public and passengers, mainly houses the airport administration offices.

East and West Wing

Each wing contains its own departure gates, as well as two cafés (one of which features a smoking section), a newsstand, a tourism shop, and smaller duty-free shopping areas in each wing. The East Wing, which opened in 1998, has gates 1–12 and the West Wing, which opened in 2002, has gates 13–23. Gates 2 and 3 are dual jetway gates for large aircraft. Gates 4 and 22 are bus boarding gates, however these are almost never used. The only way to move from one wing to the next is through the main terminal.

Passenger services
The airport also includes banks, a post office, massage chairs, prayer rooms, and a tourist information centre. The airport is the first in the region to offer 5G wireless internet services available for free for 2 hours.

Airlines and destinations

Passenger

Cargo

Statistics

Passenger use and aircraft movements have increased each year since 1990 with the exception of 2006, which saw a sharp decrease in both. Total cargo has trended upwards since 1990 but also experienced a significant decrease in 2006.

Ground transport
The airport has a three-level car park with a total capacity of 2,350 cars.

Public transportation to the airport does not exist, except for taxis. These tend to be more expensive than regular service taxis, however.

LCC Bus Route 1 takes passengers from the airport roundabout, which is located one kilometer from the terminal, to Rue Sadat in Hamra, whereas Route 5 takes to the Charles Helou bus station. OCFTC buses number seven and ten also stop at the airport roundabout, en route to central Beirut.

Airport services
Airport services, like much else in Lebanon, are often divided and delegated based upon sectarian allegiance. Such as the Shia party Hezbollah, other groups, including Sunnis and Maronites, have their own fiefs within the airport's provision of services.

Ground handling providers
The airport has two ground handling operators, Middle East Airlines Ground Handling (MEAG) Lebanese Air Transport (LAT).

Middle East Airlines Ground Handling (MEAG) is a wholly owned subsidiary of the national carrier, MEA. It provides ground handling services for the national carrier, MEA, as well as most of the carriers serving the airport, including the cargo carriers. MEAG handles nearly 80% of the traffic at the airport. 

Lebanese Air Transport (LAT) is a smaller ground handling operator that conducts ground handling operations for a number of carriers serving the airport. LAT specialises in handling charter flights, but does have contracts with a number of scheduled carriers such as British Airways.

Fixed-base operators
The airport is home to four fixed-base operators (FBOs) for private aircraft.

MEAG recently launched its own FBO services with the opening of the new General Aviation Terminal called the Cedar Jet Centre, now regarded as the airport's top FBO. Another leading FBO is Aircraft Support & Services, which specialises in fixed-base operator services for private and executive aircraft. In addition, they operate two executive jets that can be chartered to various places. JR Executive operates a fleet of small propeller aircraft that can be chartered or leased.  They also have a flight school, and conduct maintenance on light aircraft while offering fixed-base operator services. Cirrus Middle East, a member of the German Cirrus Group, partnered up with Universal Weather and Aviation to create a fixed-base operator and VIP charter service, which was launched on 15 October 2012.  The company will initially be called Universal/Cirrus Middle East, but will eventually become Universal Aviation Beirut. They aim to become one of the top FBOs in the Middle East and will cater aircraft as large as Boeing 747s.

LAT offers limited fixed-base operator services for private and executive aircraft. Executive Aircraft Services offers aircraft charter services, ground handling services, aircraft management, and aircraft acquisition and sales.

Aircraft maintenance providers
The airport is the home base of MidEast Aircraft Services Company (MASCO), an aircraft maintenance provider that specialises in Airbus maintenance, particularly the A320 and A330 series. It is a wholly owned subsidiary of the national carrier, MEA. MASCO has JAR 145 approval and as a result can maintain any aircraft registered in Europe.

Other facilities
Middle East Airlines has its corporate headquarters and training centre at Beirut Airport.

Accidents and incidents
 On 21 November 1959, Ariana Afghan Airlines Flight 202 crashed near Beirut on a flight from Beirut to Tehran, killing 24 of the 27 passengers and crew on board the Douglas DC-4.
 On 23 February 1964, Vickers Viscount SU-AKX of United Arab Airlines was damaged beyond economic repair in a heavy landing.
 On 30 September 1975 a Tupolev Tu-154 of Malév Hungarian Airlines, Malév Flight 240 crashed into the sea while approaching the airport. The cause and the circumstances remain mysterious, but it was most likely shot down. All 50 passengers and 10 crew were killed.
 In September 1970, Pan Am Flight 93 was hijacked while flying to New York. The plane landed to refuel and pick up another PFLP hijacker. It was then flown to Cairo where it was blown up.
 On 17 May 1977, Antonov An-12, SP-LZA, a cargo plane leased by LOT Polish Airlines from the Polish Air Force along with its crew, flying to Lebanon with a cargo of fresh strawberries crashed 8 kilometers from Beirut airport, all 6 crew members and 3 passengers on board were killed. The plane crashed due to the crew being lost in translation (i.e. the Polish-speaking crew did not understand the Lebanese Arabic language), which led to the crew repeating to themselves the order to descend, ending up with the aircraft unwittingly flying into the side of a mountain.
 On 23 July 1979, a TMA Boeing 707-320C, on a test flight for four copilots due to be promoted to captains, crashed whilst on a third touch-and-go. The plane touched down but then yawed right to left to right again before the wing clipped the ground causing the plane to flip and come to rest inverted across a taxiway. All six crew members were killed.
 On 8 January 1987, Middle East Airlines Boeing 707-323C OD-AHB was destroyed by shelling after landing.
 On 25 January 2010, Ethiopian Airlines Flight 409, bound for Addis Ababa, Ethiopia and carrying 90 passengers (of which 54 were Lebanese) crashed into the Mediterranean Sea shortly after take-off, killing everyone on board.

See also
 Lebanese identity card
 Lebanese passport
 List of airports in Lebanon
 Transport in Lebanon
 Visa policy of Lebanon
 Visa requirements for Lebanese citizens

References

 Attribution

External links

 Beirut International Airport 
 
 
 

1954 establishments in Lebanon
Airports established in 1954
Airports in Lebanon
Buildings and structures in Beirut
Transport in Beirut